Mahamaya Irrigation Project is an irrigation project in Bangladesh situated at Durgapur Union, Mirsharai Upazila, Chittagong. Initiated in the 2007-2008 financial year, the project provides irrigation water to a 3360 hectare area. It cost about 230 million taka and construction was completed in 2009. This project was inaugurated by Prime Minister Sheikh Hasina on 29 December 2010. It is the second largest man made lake in Bangladesh after Kaptai Lake.

The project also provided recreational areas.

Government is also planning to install a 50 kW mini hydro electric powerplant here.

Gallery

References

External links
 Development of Renewable Energy Technologies by BPDB
 Bangladesh: Poverty Reduction Strategy Paper By International Monetary Fund. African Dept.
 The Bay Belongs to Bangladesh - Energy & Power

Agriculture in Bangladesh
Irrigation projects
Chittagong District
Karnaphuli River
Water supply and sanitation in Bangladesh
1962 establishments in Pakistan
History of Chittagong Division